Gostkowo  is a village in the administrative district of Gmina Szulborze Wielkie, within Ostrów Mazowiecka County, Masovian Voivodeship, in east-central Poland.

Monuments 
 Statue of St. John of Nepomuk

References

Villages in Ostrów Mazowiecka County